Panoan (also Pánoan, Panoano, Panoana, Páno) is a family of languages spoken in Peru, western Brazil, and Bolivia. It is possibly a branch of a larger Pano–Tacanan family.

Genetic relations
The Panoan family is generally believed to be related to the Tacanan family, forming with it Pano–Tacanan, though this has not yet been established (Loos 1999).

Language contact
Jolkesky (2016) notes that there are lexical similarities with the Kechua, Mapudungun, Moseten-Tsimane, Tukano, Uru-Chipaya, Harakmbet, Arawak, Kandoshi, and Pukina language families due to contact.

Languages

There are some 18 extant and 14 extinct Panoan languages. In the list of Panoan languages below adapted from Fleck (2013), (†) means extinct, and (*) obsolescent (no longer spoken daily).  Dialects are listed in parentheses.

Mayoruna
Tabatinga Mayoruna [most divergent] †
Mayo
Matses
Matses (Peruvian Matses, Brazilian Matses, Paud Usunkid†)
 Kulino (of Curuça)* (Kapishtana*, Mawi*, Chema*)
 Demushbo †
Korubo (Korubo, Chankueshbo*)
Matis
Matis
Jandiatuba Mayoruna †
Amazon Mayoruna † (two dialects)
Mainline Panoan
Kasharari [most divergent]
Kashibo (Kashibo, Rubo/Isunbo, Kakataibo, Nokaman)
Nawa branch (from least to most divergent)
Bolivian
Chokobo/Pakawara (Chokobo, Pakawara)
Karipuna [possibly a dialect of Chokobo-Pakawara] †
? Chiriba †
Madre de Dios † 
Atsawaka-Yamiaka † (Atsawaka, Yamiaka) 
Arazaire † 
Blanco River Remo † 
Tarauacá Kashinawa †
Marubo
Marubo [of the Javari Basin]
Katukina (or Waninawa: Katukina of Olinda, Katukina of Sete Estrelas, Kanamari†)
Olivença Kulina
 Poyanawa*
 Poyanawa †
 Iskonawa*
 Nukini †
 ?Môa Nawa* [tentative due to lack of data]
 Jaquirana Remo †
Chama
Shipibo (Shipibo-Konibo, Tapiche Kapanawa*) 
Pano* (Pano †, Shetebo*, Piskino*)
Sensi † 
Headwaters
Ibuaçu Kashinawa (Brazilian Kashinawa, Peruvian Kashinawa, Juruá Kapanawa†, Parannawa†)
Yaminawa (Brazilian Yaminawa dialects, Peruvian Yaminawa, Chaninawa, Chitonawa, Mastanawa, Parkenawa (= Yora), Shanenawa, Sharanawa/Marinawa, Shawannawa (= Arara), Yawanawa, Yaminawa-arara*, Nehanawa†)
Amawaka (Peruvian Amawaka, Nishinawa†, Yumanawa†)
Môa Remo † (resembles Amawaka)
Tuchinawa † (resembles Yaminawa dialects)

Boundaries between the Poyanawa, Chama, and Headwaters groups are somewhat blurred. Karipuna and Môa River Nawa may not be distinct languages, and Chiriba may not be Panoan at all.

Hundreds of other Panoan "languages" have been reported in the literature. These are names of groups that may have been ethnically Panoan, but whose language is unattested. They sometimes are assumed to be Panoan on no other evidence than that the name ends in -nawa or -bo. A few, such as Maya (Pisabo), are unattested but reported to be mutually intelligible with a known Panoan language (in this case Matsés). The people speaking one of these supposed languages, was rediscovered in 2002. However, no linguistic information is available, and it is not known if they speak a distinct language.

Amarante Ribeiro (2005)
Classification of the Panoan languages according to Amarante Ribeiro (2005):

Group I
Amawaka
Group II
Subgroup II-1
Kashibo
Nokaman
Subgroup II-2
Shipibo
Kapanawa
Panobo
Group III
Subgroup III-1
Iskonawa
Kaxinawa
Subgroup III-2
Subgroup III-2-1
Nukini
Remo
Subgroup III-2-2
Subgroup III-2-2-1
Kanamari
Katukina
Marubo
Subgroup III-2-2-2
Mastanawa
Tuxinawa
Yoranawa
Sharanawa
Shanenawa
Arara
Yawanawa
Xitonawa
Yaminawa
Subgroup III-2-3
Kaxarari
Poyanawa
Group IV
Subgroup IV-1
Kapishto
Matsés
Kulina
Matis
Subgroup IV-2
Atsawaka
Arazaire
Yamiaka
Subgroup IV-3
Karipuna
Chacobo
Pakawara

Oliveira (2014)
Internal classification by Oliveira (2014: 123):
Group 1: Kashíbo
Group 2
Shípibo-Kónibo, Kapanáwa
Marúbo (?)
Group 3: Chákobo, Kaxararí (?)
Group 4: Yamináwa, Chanináwa, Sharanáwa
Group 5: Shanenáwa, Katukína
Group 6: Poyanáwa (?), Amawáka
Group 7
Kaxinawá, Marináwa
Yawanawá
Group 8: Mayorúna, Matís, Korúbo

Jolkesky (2016)
Internal classification by Jolkesky (2016):

(† = extinct)

Pano
Pano, Northern
Kulina (Pano)
Korubo
Matis
Matses
Pisabo
Pano, Nuclear
Kasharari
Pano, Western
Kashibo, Kakataibo
Nokaman †
Pano, Central
Purus
Amawaka
Kashinawa
Yaminawa-Iskonawa-Marinawa: Iskonawa, Marinawa, Yaminawa; Yawanawa
Jurua
Kanamari (Pano)
Katukina (Pano)
Marubo
Nukini-Remo
Nukini
Remo †
Poyanawa
Atsawaka †
Arazaeri †
Atsawaka †
Yamiaka †
Chakobo
Chakobo
Karipuna (Pano)
Pakawara
Shipibo-Kapanawa
Kapanawa
Shipibo-Wariapano: Sensi †; Wariapano; Shipibo

Homonyms
Much of the confusion surrounding Panoan languages is the number of homonyms among different languages. The principal ambiguous names are as follows:

Neighboring languages of other families may also share the names of Panoan language.  The table below ignores other homonyms further afield:

Varieties
Below is a full list of Panoan language varieties listed by Loukotka (1968), including names of unattested varieties.

Northern languages
Pano / Pánobo - spoken in the village of Contamana on the Ucayali River, Loreto province, Peru.
Maruba / Maxuruna / Mayoruna / Pelado / Dallus - spoken on the Maruba River and Jandiatuba River, state of Amazonas.
Culino - extinct language once spoken between the Jutaí River, Javarí River, and Jandiatuba River, Amazonas.
Panau - spoken by only a few families in Seringal Barão, Rio Branco, territory of Acre, Brazil. (Unattested.)
Cashibo / Cacataibo / Caxivo / Hagueti - spoken on the Pachitea River, Pisqui River, and Aguaytía River, Loreto, Peru.
Manamabobo - extinct language once spoken on the Pachitea River, Peru. (Unattested.)
Carapacho / Caliseca - once spoken on the Carapacho River, Peru. (Unattested.)
Pichobo - once spoken at the mouth of the Paguamigua River in Peru. (Unattested.)
Sobolbo / Bolbo - once spoken on the Cohengua River, Peru. (Unattested.)
Mochobo - once spoken between the Guanie River and Guarimi River. (Unattested.)
Maspo - once spoken on the Taco River and Manipaboro River. (Unattested.)
Comobo / Univitsa - once spoken in the same region on the Inua River and Unini River. (Unattested.)
Conibo / Cunibo / Curibeo - spoken along the Ucayali River between 8° 30' and 10° latitude.
Cháma / Manava / Chipeo / Setebo / Shipibo / Puinahva - spoken on the Ucayali River north of the Conibo tribe.
Nocamán - spoken at the sources of the Chesco River, Loreto.
Ruanagua - spoken on the Corjuania River, Loreto. (Unattested.)
Capanagua - spoken on the Tapiche River and Blanco River, Loreto.
Busquipani - once spoken on the Alacrán River, Loreto. (Unattested.)
Custanáwa - spoken on the upper course of the Purus River near the mouth of the Curanja River, Loreto. (Unattested.)
Espino - spoken on the Curumaha River in the same region. (Unattested.)
Yura - once spoken on the Piqueyaco River, Loreto. (Unattested.)
Marináwa - spoken on the Furnaya River, Loreto. (Pike and Scott 1962.)
Xaranáwa - spoken on the Curanja River, Loreto. (Unattested.)
Canawari - extinct language once spoken on the Curumaha River and Rixalá River, Acre territory, Brazil
Nucuini / Remo / Rheno - spoken at the sources of the Javari River and on the Moenalco River and Ipixuna River, state of Amazonas.
Amahuaca / Sayaco / Impetineri - spoken on the Urubamba River and Ucayali River, Loreto, and on the Purus River and Juruá River, Acre.
Mastináhua - spoken on the Purus River in the same territory. (Unattested.)
Cachináua / Huñikui - spoken between the Embira River, Liberdade River, and Tarauacá River, state of Amazonas.
Tuxináua - spoken on the Embira River and Humaitá River, Acre.
Camanáwa - on the Môa River in Acre. (Unattested.)
Pacanáwa - spoken at the sources of the Embira River, Acre. (Unattested.)
Nehanáwa - spoken by a small tribe on the Jordão River, Acre.
Nastanáwa - spoken on the upper course of the Jordão River.
Cuyanáwa - spoken between the Môa River and Paraná dos Mouros River, Acre territory. (Unattested.)
Sacuya - once spoken between the Juruá River and Tamaya River, Acre. (Unattested.)
Xanindáua - spoken by a small tribe on the Riozinho River, Acre. (Unattested.)
Coronáwa - spoken in the Acre territory, but exact location unknown. (Unattested.)
Yauavo - once spoken between the Tejo River and Aturia River, Acre. (Unattested.)

Yaminaua group
Yaminaua - spoken at the sources of the Tarauaca River, territory of Acre.
Poyanáwa - spoken in Acre territory on the Môa River.
Yumanáwa - spoken on the Muruzinho River, Acre.
Paran-náwa - spoken on the Muru River, Acre.
Nixináwa - spoken on the Jordão River, Acre.
Yawanáwa - spoken in Acre territory on the upper course of the Jordão River.
Sanináwa / Shanináua - spoken on the Valparaiso River, Liberdade River, and Humaitá River, Acre.
Xipináwa - spoken between the Valparaiso River and Liberdade River. (Unattested.)
Aranáwa - spoken between the Humaitá River and Liberdade River. (Unattested.)
Contanáwa - spoken in Acre on the upper course of the Tarauaca River and on the Humaitá River. (Unattested.)
Yumináhua - spoken on the Tarauaca River, Acre. (Unattested.)
Wamináua / Catoquino do rio Gregorio - spoken in the same territory on the Gregorio River.

Sensi group
Sensi - spoken on the Huanachá River and Chanuya River, department of Loreto, Peru.

Central group
Yamiaca / Haauñeiri - spoken by a small tribe on the Yaguarmayo River, department of Madre de Dios, Peru.
Arazaire - language spoken by a few families in the same region on the Marcapata River.
Atsahuaca / Chaspa - spoken on the Carama River in Peru.
Araua - extinct language once spoken on the Chiva River, territory of Colonia, Bolivia. (Unattested.)

Eastern group
Chacobo - spoken around Lake Rogoaguado, Beni province, Bolivia.
Capuibo - once spoken on the Biata River in Beni province, Bolivia. (Unattested.)
Pacaguara - language now probably extinct, once spoken between the Beni River and Abuña River.
Sinabo / Shenabu / Gritones - language now probably extinct, once spoken on the Mamoré River near Los Almendrales, Beni Province. (Unattested.)
Caripuna / Jaunavô / Shakáre / Éloe / Yacariá - spoken in the nineteenth century along the Madeira River and the sources of the Beni River, now only in a single village at the mouth of the Mutumparaná River, Rondônia.
Pama / Pamainá - language of an unknown tribe of the Caldeirão River, territory of Rondônia. (Unattested.)

Grammatical features

Body-part prefixation

Exceptional to Panoan languages' predominantly suffixal morphology are sets of approximately 30 morphemes primarily referring to parts or features of prototypical human and animal bodies (and, by analogical extension, of botanicals, manufactures, landscapes, and abstract space) which have been found to occur in almost all attested languages of the family (Fleck 2006: 59; Ferreira 2007, 2008; Amarante Ribeiro and Cândido 2008; Zariquiey and Fleck 2012: 385–386).

That these monosyllabic forms are productively affixed to the front of verbal, nominal, or adjectival roots has led many Panoanists to describe them as prefixes (e.g. Prost 1967 and Zingg 1998 [for Chakobo]; Faust 1973, Loriot et al. 1993, and Valenzuela 2003 [for Shipibo-Konibo]; Hyde 1980 [for Amawaka]; Eakin 1991[for Yaminawa]), while the forms' resemblance and loose semantic correspondence to unbound, polysyllabic 'body-part terms' has led others to describe them as incorporated nouns (e.g. Loos 1999). More recent and detailed analyses of this feature in Matses (Fleck 2006) and Kashibo-Kakataibo (Zariquiey and Fleck 2012) have demonstrated that most body-part prefixes in these languages are not readily analyzable as synchronic allomorphs of the nouns they resemble.

Many Panoan body-part prefixes semantically encompass a range of denotata beyond the strictly 'corporeal' by means of analogical extension. In Matses, for example, the prefix an- corresponds to the nouns ana 'mouth, tongue, palm (of hand), sole (of foot), (arm)pit'; anmaëşh 'gill slits (of fish)'; and anşhantuk 'swampy depression in the ground'; but can itself be glossed also as 'cavity, concave surface, interior, underside'; and 'center (of path of stream)' (Fleck 2006: 64). In the examples below, the prefix an- with the verb root kiad 'learn' expresses the learning of a specifically 'oral activity' while the prefix më- 'hand, mortar, forearm, wrist, projecting carpal bones, elbow, finger, knuckles, fingernail, branch' expresses the learning of a specifically 'manual' one:

{|
|-
| an-kiad-o-bi
|-
| mouth-learn-PAST-1S
|-
| 'I learned with respect to (my) mouth', i.e., 'I learned an oral activity' (a language, to speak, a song, to sing, to recite the alphabet, to whistle, to eat a type of food, etc.) (Fleck 2006: 78)
|}

{|
|-
| më-kiad-o-bi
|-
| hand-learn-PAST-1S
|-
| 'I learned to weave, write, do math problems, fire shotgun, fletch arrows, or other manual tasks' (Fleck 2006: 78)
|}

The following example illustrates how an- can express locative information in non-corporeal, topographical space:

{|
|-
| nëid-ø || an-san-aşh || we-ta || ø || ke-pa-ak || ka-denne-k || ke-onda-şh
|-
| this.one-ABS || center-put:PL.O-after:S/A>S || lie-IMPER || 3ABS || say-TOP.CONT-NARR.PAST || tell-REM.PAST.INDIC || tell-DIST.PAST-3
|}
'"Put this one in the middle [of the path] and then lie down!" he [the moon] said, they used to tell, I was told' (Fleck 2006: 80).

While body-part prefixes in Kashibo-Kakataibo, as in Matses, are highly productive with verbs, they are used regularly with only a modest array of adjectives and nouns (Fleck 2006: 72; Zariquiey and Fleck 2012: 394–5). Zariquiey and Fleck (2012: 394) note that the Kashibo-Kakataibo "words for 'skin', 'hair', and 'flesh'" are regularly prefixed:

{|
|-
| kapë || të-şhaka || mëra-aşh ...
|-
| caiman || neck-skin.ABS || find-S/A>S
|}
 'finding the caiman's neck skin ...' (Zariquiey and Fleck 2012: 395).

Due to the paucity of detailed studies of Panoan body-part prefixes, explanations of their grammaticalization remain largely speculative. Fleck has hypothesized that "Panoan (verb) prefixation evolved from past noun incorporation that co-existed with noun-noun and noun-adjective compounding that involved synchronic reduction of body-part roots" (2006: 92). In light of their analysis of Kashibo-Kakataibo prefixation, Zariquiey and Fleck present two diachronic scenarios to orient future comparative work: "(1) prefixation evolved from productive noun incorporation (prefixes have come from longer body-part nouns); or (2) Proto-Panoan body-part terms were monosyllabic forms that became bound, and most of the current body-part terms were later built up from these" (2012: 408).

Vocabulary
Loukotka (1968) lists the following basic vocabulary items.

Proto-language

Below are Proto-Panoan reconstructions by de Oliveira (2014). For the full list of original Portuguese glosses, see the corresponding Portuguese article.

Bibliography

 Amarante Ribeiro, Lincoln Almir, and Gláucia Viera Cândido. (2008). "A formação de palavras a partir de morfemas monossilábicos nominais e bases verbais em línguas indígenas da família Pano: Prefixação ou incorporação nominal?" Veredas On Line (UFJF) 1:129–45.
 Campbell, Lyle. (1997). American Indian languages: The historical linguistics of Native America. New York: Oxford University Press. .
 Eakin, Lucille. (1991). "Lecciones Para el Aprendizaje del Idioma Yaminahua. Documento de Trabajo no. 22. Yarinacocha, Peru: Instituto Lingüístico de Verano.
 Faust, Norma. (1973). "Lecciones Para el Aprendizaje del Idioma Shipibo-Conibo." Documento de Trabajo no. 1. Yarinacocha, Peru: Instituto Lingüístico de Verano.
 Ferreira, Rogério Vincente. (2007). "Afixos verbais em uma lingua da familia Pano." V Congreso Internacional de Investigaciones Lingüísticos-Filológicas: La Enseñanza de la Lengua en el Tercer Milenio. Lima: Universidad Ricardo Palma.
 Ferreira, Rogério Vincente. (2008). "Morfemas "partes do corpo" em Matis e algumas línguas da família Pano." Raído (Universidade Federal da Grande Dourados) 2, no. 4:35–39.
 Fleck, David. (2006). "Body-part prefixes in Matses: Derivation or noun incorporation?" IJAL 72:59–96.
 Hyde, Sylvia. (1980). "Diccionario Amahuaca" (Edición Preliminar). Serie Lingüística Peruana no. 7. Yarinacocha, Peru: Instituto Lingüístico Peruano.
 Kaufman, Terrence. (1990). "Language history in South America: What we know and how to know more." In D. L. Payne (Ed.), Amazonian linguistics: Studies in lowland South American languages (pp. 13–67). Austin: University of Texas Press. .
 Kaufman, Terrence. (1994). "The native languages of South America." In C. Mosley & R. E. Asher (Eds.), Atlas of the world's languages (pp. 46–76). London: Routledge.
Loos, E.; Loos, B. (2003). Diccionario Capanahua-Castellano. Versión electrónica ilustrada. (Serie Lingüística Peruana, 45). Lima: Summer Institute of Linguistics.
 Loos, Eugene E. (1999). "Pano." The Amazonian Languages, ed. R. M. W. Dixon and Alexandra Y. Aikhenvald, pp. 227–49. Cambridge: Cambridge University Press.
 Loriot, James; Erwin Lauriault; and Dwight Day. (1993). "Diccionario Shipibo–Castellano." Serie Lingüística Peruana no. 31. Yarinacocha, Peru: Instituto Lingüístico de Verano.
 Migliazza, Ernest C.; & Campbell, Lyle. (1988). "Panorama general de las lenguas indígenas en América". Historia general de América (Vol. 10). Caracas: Instituto Panamericano de Geografía e Historia.
 Prost, Gilbert R. (1967). "Chacobo." Bolivian Indian Grammars: 1, ed. Esther Matteson, pp. 285–359. Norman: Summer Institute of Linguistics and the University of Oklahoma.
 Rodrigues, Aryon. (1986). Linguas brasileiras: Para o conhecimento das linguas indígenas. São Paulo: Edições Loyola.
Scott, M. (2004). Vocabulario Sharanahua-Castellano. (Serie Lingüística Peruana, 53). Lima: Summer Institute of Linguistics.
 Shell, Olive A. (1975). "Las lenguas pano y su reconstrucción". Serie lingüística Peruana (No. 12). Yarinacocha, Peru: Instituto Lingüístico de Verano.
 Valenzuela, Pilar M. (2003). "Transitivity in Shipibo-Konibo grammar." Ph.D. dissertation, University of Oregon, Eugene.
 Zariquiey Biondi, Roberto and David W. Fleck. (2012). "Body-Part Prefixation in Kashibo-Kakataibo: Synchronic or Diachronic Derivation?" IJAL 78(3):385–409.
 Zingg, Philipp. (1998). Diccionario Chácobo–Castellano Castellano–Chácobo con Bosquejo de la Gramática Chacobo y con Apuntes Culturales. La Paz, Bolivia: Ministerio de Desarrollo Sostenible y Planificación Viceministro de Asuntos Indígenas y Pueblos Originarios.

References

External links
 
 Proel: Familia Panoana
 Pacahuara and Yaminahua dictionaries online from IDS (select simple or advanced browsing)
 Lenguas de Bolivia (online edition)

 
Indigenous languages of South America (Central)
Indigenous languages of Western Amazonia
Languages of Bolivia
Languages of Brazil